Redbank Valley Junior/Senior High School is a public high school, located in New Bethlehem, Pennsylvania. There are about 650 students and 45 faculty members. The school serves students in southern Clarion County and northern Armstrong County.

For more information, or for those wishing to view the district page, please go to the Redbank Valley School District page.

School history
The Redbank Valley School opened its doors for the first time for the start of the 1957-58 school term. For two years prior to the school's opening, the students were educated at the local Fire Hall, an automotive garage, and other facilities in the community of New Bethlehem. The school was renovated during the summer of 1996, at which time, the nearby Redbank Creek overflowed its banks, causing moderate damage to the school. The school was featured on ABC's Nightline during the presidential election of 2016. It was again featured on ABC's Nightline after the first 100 days of the Trump presidency.

School library
The library  offers a wide array of services.  Students can search for approximately 18,000 titles in the print and non-print collection via a web-based catalog..  In addition to regular Internet searching, students can use the following online databases:
 World Book Online
 Science Today
 Issues and Controversies
 World & I
 Discovery Education

Several reference ebooks have been added to the collection to expand the availability of resources. There are 28 computers available for use and students can borrow Digital video recorders as well as digital cameras for school projects.

Graduation requirements
Students at Redbank must complete 24 credits of coursework, which included the state-mandiated Graduation Project and score sufficiently on the PSSA's.

Credit structure

Clarion County Career Center
Students in Grades 10-12 who wish to pursue a vocational trade can attend Clarion County Career Center if they wish to do so part-time.

Athletics
Redbank Valley participates in PIAA District IX (9).

References 

Public high schools in Pennsylvania
Schools in Clarion County, Pennsylvania
1957 establishments in Pennsylvania